Peter Gartmayer (born February 25, 1978) is a beach volleyball player from Austria.

He and teammate Robert Nowotny represented Austria at the 2004 Summer Olympics in Athens, Greece. Four years later, he and teammate Clemens Doppler represented Austria at the 2008 Summer Olympics in Beijing, China.  Won a gold medal at the 2007 European Beach Volleyball Championship.

In the 2010–11 season, he began his career as an assistant coach of the SVS Schwechat Wien (Austrian national league women).

References

External links
 Athlete bio at 2008 Olympics site
 Assistant Coach in MEVZA 2010/2011

1978 births
Living people
Beach volleyball players at the 2004 Summer Olympics
Beach volleyball players at the 2008 Summer Olympics
Austrian beach volleyball players
Olympic beach volleyball players of Austria
Men's beach volleyball players